Lake Wairarapa is a lake at the southern end of the North Island of New Zealand,  east of Wellington. It is the third largest in the North Island, fractionally smaller than Lake Rotorua. The nearest town to the lake is Featherston, which is located five kilometres from its northern shore.

The lake forms part of the Wairarapa Moana Wetlands, a regional park administered by Wellington Regional Council, in collaboration with Kahungunu ki Wairarapa, the Department of Conservation, South Wairarapa District Council, and Rangitāne o Wairarapa. The wetland is the largest in the lower North Island, one of the largest in New Zealand, and was recognised as a wetland of international significance under the Ramsar Convention in August 2020.

Geography

The lake's catchment area is large, and includes the eastern slopes of the Remutaka and Tararua Ranges. The lake takes water from several rivers and was originally the main outflow for the Ruamahanga. This in turn drained slowly into Palliser Bay and Cook Strait ten kilometres south near the settlement of Lake Ferry, via what is now Lake Onoke. The river, however, was diverted in the 1960s to assist flow, thereby reducing flooding for farmers.

The area around the lake is low-lying and swampy, and recent efforts have been made to preserve its important wetland features and restore wildlife habitat that has been degraded through human use. Agriculture and river development, flood control, and waterway diversions have resulted in the drainage of large areas of the wetlands, reducing their ecological values.

Lake Wairarapa is classed as supertrophic on the trophic level index, meaning that it is highly polluted with nitrates which leach from intensified agriculture surrounding the lake. This is in line with the wider trend of agriculture polluting New Zealand rivers and lakes.

History

The name Wairarapa means "glistening waters" in te reo Māori. According to some oral histories, the Polynesian explorer Kupe named the wetlands after touching down in the area several times. According to other oral histories, explorer Haunui named the wetlands after the way the lake appeared to glisten from the Remutaka Ranges to the west.

The lake has long been used by Māori as a source of readily available food, and many species of waterfowl and fish uncommon elsewhere in New Zealand can be found in or around the lake.

See also
List of lakes in New Zealand
Lakes of New Zealand

References

External links

Wairarapa Moana Wetlands Park at the Department of Conservation
Wairarapa Moana Wetlands Project official website

Wairarapa, Lake
South Wairarapa District
Ramsar sites in New Zealand
Wetlands of the Wellington Region